Lake Tanganyika Stadium is a multi-purpose stadium in Kigoma-Ujiji District, Kigoma, Tanzania. It is used mostly for football matches. The stadium holds 20,000.

References

Football venues in Tanzania
Multi-purpose stadiums in Tanzania
Buildings and structures in the Kigoma Region
Chama Cha Mapinduzi